Gaz Khan or Goz Khun is a village in the Wakhan in Badakhshan Province in north-eastern Afghanistan. It is located at the confluence of the Panj River and Wakhan River,  The village is the starting point for treks into the Great Pamir.

Gaz Khan is inhabited by Wakhi people.  The population of the village (2003) is 149.

References

Populated places in Wakhan District
Wakhan